Fourspot flounder or four-spotted flounder is a common name for several fishes and may refer to:

Hippoglossina oblonga, native to the western Atlantic Ocean
Hippoglossina tetrophthalma, native to the eastern Pacific Ocean